James Graham Clinton (January 2, 1804 – May 28, 1849) was an American lawyer and politician. He served two terms as a U.S. Representative from New York from 1841 to 1845.

Early life
Born in Little Britain, New York on January 2, 1804, he was the son of Mary Little (1768–1835) and Major-General James Clinton (1736–1812), a brevet major general in the American Revolutionary War. He was the half brother of DeWitt Clinton (1769–1828), the 6th Governor of New York, and George Clinton, Jr. (1771–1809), a U.S. Representative, through his father's first marriage to Mary De Witt (1737–1795).  His uncle was George Clinton (1739–1812), who served as the 1st and 3rd Governor of New York from 1777 to 1795 and the U.S. Vice President from 1805 to 1812. His grandfather was Col. Charles Clinton (1690–1773), an Anglo-Irish colonel during the French and Indian War.

Clinton attended the common schools and Newburgh Academy.  He studied law, was admitted to the bar in 1823 and practiced in Newburgh.

Career
Clinton served as Orange County Master in Chancery, and judge of the county court of common pleas.

He served as director of the Newburgh Whaling Company and of the Delaware and Hudson Railway.  Clinton was also a colonel in the New York Militia.

Clinton was elected as a Democrat to the Twenty-seventh and Twenty-eighth Congresses (March 4, 1841 – March 3, 1845). He served as chairman of the Committee on Public Expenditures (Twenty-eighth Congress).  He was not a candidate for reelection in 1844, and resumed practicing law.

Death and burial
Clinton died in New York City on May 28, 1849 at the age of 45.  He was interred in the family cemetery at Little Britain, and reinterred at Woodlawn Cemetery in New Windsor.

References
Notes

Sources

External links

1804 births
1849 deaths
American people of English descent
People from New Windsor, New York
New York (state) lawyers
New York (state) state court judges
American militia officers
Democratic Party members of the United States House of Representatives from New York (state)
Politicians from Newburgh, New York
19th-century American politicians
Clinton family of New York
19th-century American judges
19th-century American lawyers